"Second Honeymoon" is a song originally recorded by Johnny Cash. It was written for him by Autry Inman.

The song was released as a single by Columbia Records (Columbia 4-41707, with "Honky-Tonk Girl" on the opposite side) in June or July 1960.

Charts

References 

Johnny Cash songs
1960 singles
Songs written by Autry Inman
Columbia Records singles
1960 songs